The WD40 repeat (also known as the WD or beta-transducin repeat) is a short structural motif of approximately 40 amino acids, often terminating in a tryptophan-aspartic acid (W-D) dipeptide.  Tandem copies of these repeats typically fold together to form a type of circular solenoid protein domain called the WD40 domain.

Structure
WD40 domain-containing proteins have 4 to 16 repeating units, all of which are thought to form a circularised beta-propeller structure (see figure to the right). The WD40 domain is composed of several repeats, a variable region of around 20 residues at the beginning followed by a more common repeated set of residues. These repeats typically form a four stranded anti-parallel beta sheet or blade. These blades come together to form a propeller with the most common being a 7 bladed beta propeller.  The blades interlock so that the last beta strand of one repeat forms with the first three of the next repeat to form the 3D blade structure.

Function
WD40-repeat proteins are a large family found in all eukaryotes and are implicated in a variety of functions ranging from signal transduction and transcription regulation to cell cycle control, autophagy and apoptosis. The underlying common function of all WD40-repeat proteins is coordinating multi-protein complex assemblies, where the repeating units serve as a rigid scaffold for protein interactions. The specificity of the proteins is determined by the sequences outside the repeats themselves. Examples of such complexes are G proteins (beta subunit is a beta-propeller), TAFII transcription factor, and E3 ubiquitin ligase.

Examples
According to the initial analysis of the human genome WD40 repeats are the eighth largest family of proteins. In all 277 proteins were identified to contain them. Human genes encoding proteins containing this domain include:
 AAAS, AAMP, AHI1, AMBRA1, APAF1, ARPC1A, ARPC1B, ATG16L1,
 BOP1, BRWD1, BRWD3, BTRC, BUB3,
 C6orf11, CDC20, CDC40, CDRT1, CHAF1B, CIAO1, CIRH1A, COPA, COPB2, CORO1A, CORO1B, CORO1C, CORO2A, CORO2B, CORO6, CORO7, CSTF1,
 DDB2, DENND3, DMWD, DMXL1, DMXL2, DNAI1, DNAI2, DNCI1, DTL, DYNC1I1, DYNC1I2, EDC4,
 EED, EIF3S2, ELP2, EML1, EML2, EML3, EML4, EML4-ALK, EML5, ERCC8,
 FBXW10, FBXW11, FBXW2, FBXW4, FBXW5, FBXW7, FBXW8, FBXW9, FZR1,
 GBL, GEMIN5, GNB1, GNB1L, GNB2, GNB2L1, GNB3, GNB4, GNB5, GRWD1, GTF3C2,
 HERC1, HIRA, HZGJ,
 IFT121, IFT122, IFT140, IFT172, IFT80, IQWD1,
 KATNB1, KIAA1336, KIF21A, KIF21B, KM-PA-2,
 KEAP1,
 LLGL1, LLGL2, LRBA, LRRK1, LRRK2, LRWD1, LYST,
 MAPKBP1, MED16, MORG1,
 NBEA, NBEAL1, NEDD1, NLE1, NSMAF, NUP37, NUP43, NWD1,
 PAAF1, PAFAH1B1, PAK1IP1, PEX7, PHIP, PIK3R4, PLAA, PLRG1, PPP2R2A, PPP2R2B, PPP2R2C, PPP2R2D, PPWD1, PREB, PRPF19, PRPF4, PWP1, PWP2,
 RAE1, RPTOR, RBBP4, RBBP5, RBBP7, RFWD2, RFWD3, RRP9,
 SCAP, SEC13, SEC31A, SEC31B, SEH1L, SHKBP1, SMU1, SPAG16, SPG, STRAP, STRN, STRN3, STRN4, STXBP5, STXBP5L,
 TAF5, TAF5L, TBL1X, TBL1XR1, TBL1Y, TBL2, TBL3, TEP1, THOC3, THOC6, TLE1, TLE2, TLE3, TLE4, TLE6, TRAF7, TSSC1, TULP4, TUWD12,
 UTP15, UTP18,
 WAIT1, WDF3, WDFY1, WDFY2, WDFY3, WDFY4, WDHD1, WDR1, WDR10, WDR11, WDR12, WDR13, WDR16, WDR17, WDR18, WDR19, WDR20, WDR21A, WDR21C, WDR22, WDR23, WDR24, WDR25, WDR26, WDR27, WDR3, WDR31, WDR32, WDR33, WDR34, WDR35, WDR36, WDR37, WDR38, WDR4, WDR40A, WDR40B, WDR40C, WDR41, WDR42A, WDR42B, WDR43, WDR44, WDR46, WDR47, WDR48, WDR49, WDR5, WDR51A, WDR51B, WDR52, WDR53, WDR54, WDR55, WDR57, WDR59, WDR5B, WDR6, WDR60, WDR61, WDR62, WDR63, WDR64, WDR65, WDR66, WDR67, WDR68, WDR69, WDR7, WDR70, WDR72, WDR73, WDR74, WDR75, WDR76, WDR77, WDR78, WDR79, WDR8, WDR81, WDR82, WDR85, WDR86, WDR88, WDR89, WDR90, WDR91, WDR92, WDSOF1, WDSUB1, WDTC1, WSB1, WSB2,
 ZFP106

See also
 Beta-propeller
 Tomosyn, a protein two WD40 domains
 Protein tandem repeats

References

External links